Coprotus is a genus of dung-inhabiting "cup fungi"; it has been assigned to the family Thelebolaceae, though doubt has subsequently been thrown on that placement.

Species
Coprotus albidus
Coprotus arduennensis
Coprotus argenteus
Coprotus aurora
Coprotus baeosporus
Coprotus dextrinoideus
Coprotus dhofarensis
Coprotus disculus
Coprotus duplus
Coprotus glaucellus
Coprotus granuliformis
Coprotus lacteus
Coprotus leucopocillum
Coprotus luteus
Coprotus marginatus
Coprotus niveus
Coprotus ochraceus
Coprotus rhyparobioides
Coprotus sarangpurensis
Coprotus sexdecimsporus
Coprotus sphaerosporus
Coprotus trichosuri
Coprotus uncinatus
Coprotus vicinus
Coprotus winteri

References

Leotiomycetes genera
Taxa named by Richard P. Korf